Varsseveld is a railway station located in Varsseveld, Netherlands. The station was opened on 15 July 1885 and is located on the Winterswijk–Zevenaar railway. The train services are operated by Arriva. Varsseveld was once a junction, where the railway branch to Dinxperlo started, but that line has been closed and demolished since 1935.

Train services

Bus services

External links

NS website 
Dutch Public Transport journey planner 
Arriva Gelderland website 
Arriva Achterhoek Network Map 

Railway stations in Gelderland
Railway stations opened in 1885
Oude IJsselstreek